Haq TV is a Pakistani television channel with a non-sectarian religious focus. Its mission is to keep viewers in touch with the modern dynamics of Islam, without bias or sectarianism. It sheds light on modern-day Islam to provide a fair assessment of the religion to many non-Muslims too. It transmits in Urdu. Unusually for a Pakistani religious channel, news reports are also broadcast on this channel.

Programmes
 Talawat-e-Quran-e-Pak
 Durs-e-Quran
 Seerat-e-Sahaba
 Nagina or Aap
 Wilayat TV
 Zouq-e-Naat
 Alhudda International
 Rizwan Siddiqui kay Mehman
 Alrahman-Al-Raheem
 News headlines

See also
 Hidayat TV
 Hadi TV

External links
 Official website
 Live streams of Haq TV

Islamic television networks
Television channels and stations established in 2008
Television stations in Pakistan
Religious television stations in Pakistan